Dogs in the City is an American reality television series that premiered on May 30, 2012 on CBS in the United States. The series features New York City stand-up comedian, personal trainer, and self-proclaimed "dog guru" Justin Silver, who helps his clients solve various issues they are having with their pets. The show ended on July 11, 2012.

References

External links

2010s American reality television series
2012 American television series debuts
2012 American television series endings
CBS original programming
Dog training and behavior
English-language television shows
Television shows about dogs
Television shows set in New York City